Bruce Logan may refer to:

 Bruce Logan (author) (born 1938), New Zealand author and activist
 Bruce Logan (rower) (1886–1965), British Olympic rower
 Bruce E. Logan, American civil and environmental engineer